Durbar is a Persian-derived term (from  - darbār) meaning the kings’ or rulers’ noble court or a formal meeting where the king held all discussions regarding the state. It was used in India for a ruler's court or feudal levy as the latter came to be ruled and later administered by foreigners. A durbar may be either a feudal state council for administering the affairs of a princely state, or a purely ceremonial gathering, as in the time of the British rule in India.

The most famous Durbars belonged to great Emperors and Kings. In the north of India, cities like Baroda, Gwalior, Udaipur, Jaipur, Jodhpur, Jaisalmer, and Agra and the city of Lahore in Pakistan have palaces and forts that adorn such magnificent halls. The Mughal Emperor Akbar had two halls - one for his ministers and the other for the general public. Usually, Durbar halls are lavishly decorated with the best possible materials available at the time.

In the south of India, the Mysore Palace had a number of such halls, especially the Peacock Hall, having colour tinted glasses imported from Belgium, which were used for marriage ceremonies. The Durbar Hall in the Khilawat Mubarak, in the city of Hyderabad, Telangana, was the durbar hall of the Nizams of Hyderabad.

Beneath the main Dome of the Rastrapati Bhavan (Presidential Palace of India, today) is present the grand Durbar Hall, where many state functions, presided by the President of India, are held.

State Council

In the former sense, the native rulers like the Marathas, Rajputs, Mughals, other Hindu or Muslim monarchies, like the amir of Afghanistan, and even colonials received visitors in audience, conferred honours and conducted business in durbar.

A durbar could also be the executive council of a native state. Its membership was dual: the court's grandees, such as the vizier and major jagirdars (feudal landholders), shone at the ceremonies but the real political and administrative affairs of state rather rested with an inner circle around the prince, often known as diwan. There was some overlap between the two groups. This was originally another word for audience room and council, but in India it also applies to a privy council and chancery.

British Indian Empire

The word Durbar has come to be applied to great ceremonial gatherings  called the Delhi Durbar in Delhi and elsewhere during the period of the British Raj, held as demonstrations of the loyalty to the crown which also proved vital in various wars in which Britain engaged.

The practice was started with Lord Lytton's Proclamation Durbar of 1877 celebrating the proclamation of Queen Victoria as the first Empress of India. Durbars continued to be held in later years, with increased ceremony and grandeur than their predecessors. In 1903, for instance, the Coronation Durbar was held in Delhi to celebrate the accession of Edward VII to the British throne and title of Emperor of India. This ceremony was presided over by the Viceroy of India, Lord Curzon.

The practice of the durbar culminated in the magnificent spectacle that was the Delhi Durbar, which was held in December 1911 to officially crown the newly enthroned George V and his wife Queen Mary as Emperor and Empress of India. The King and Queen attended the Durbar in person and wore their Coronation robes, an unprecedented event in both Indian and Imperial history held with unprecedented pomp and glamour. They were the only British monarchs to visit India during the period of British rule.

No durbar was held for later British monarchs who were Emperors of India. Edward VIII reigned only a brief time before abdicating. On the accession of his brother George VI, it was decided to hold no durbar in Delhi, due to several reasons: the cost would have been a burden to the government of India, rising Indian nationalism made the welcome that the royal couple would have received likely to be muted at best, and a prolonged absence of the King from the UK would have been undesirable in the tense period before World War II.

Malaysia
In Malaysian history, the Durbar was the council comprising the four rulers of the Federated Malay States under British protectorate. First held in 1897, it was a platform for the rulers to discuss issues pertaining state policies with British officials.

When the Federation of Malaya was formed in 1948, the Durbar transformed into the Conference of Rulers with the inclusion of the other states of Malaya. The membership was further enlarged with the addition of new states in the formation of Malaysia in 1963.

Since the independence of Malaya in 1957, the Malay rulers in the Conference of Rulers function as the electoral college for the election of the federal king, the Yang di-Pertuan Agong.

Durbar Hall - Fateh Prakash Palace, Udaipur

The Durbar Hall at the Fateh Prakash Palace in Udaipur, Rajasthan, is one of the most lavish Durbar Halls in India and one of the grandest chambers in Udaipur. It is decorated with paintings of Maharanas and various weapons adorn the walls. The hall has an exquisite ceiling and is surrounded by viewing galleries from where the ladies of the palace could view the proceedings while remaining veiled. Lord Minto, the Viceroy of India, laid the foundation stone for the Durbar hall in 1909.

Durbar Hall - Khilawat Mubarak, Hyderabad
Located in the old city of Hyderabad in close proximity to the Charminar, the khliwat complex, originally spread over  had numerous palaces and structures in its vast sprawl. One of the most important buildings to have survived the passage of time is the Durbar Hall. The symbolic seat of power, it housed the "Gaddi-e-Mubarak", the hereditary throne of the Asaf Jahi dynasty.

First constructed in 1750 by the Nizam, Salabat Jung, the Khilwat complex has been added to by successive nizams. Sikandar Jah shifted his residence to the Khilwat complex from the Purani Haveli in 1803 and was responsible for the first major constructions.

The plan of the Durbar Hall is in traditional Moghul style. Subsequent remodelling, at a time when European architecture was gaining acceptance, resulted in a unique and harmonious mix of diverse architectural styles. European architectural influences, although dominant, blend smoothly with the vernacular, to create one of the best examples of Indo-European architectural synthesis. The resulting style was to become a distinctive feature of many later buildings in Hyderabad as it provided for a change without compromising the spatial needs of eastern lifestyle and social requirements.

References

Further reading
 (see index: p. 148-152)

External links

Rajasthan Tourism
The Hindu
The Hastings Museum and Art Gallery

Mughal Court
Political history of Malaysia
Government of British India
Feudalism in Asia
Indian culture
Monarchy
Royal and noble courts
Medieval India
Palaces in India
Hindi words and phrases
Urdu-language words and phrases